Attheya flexuosa is a species of diatoms in the genus Attheya. Type material was collected from Benllech, Gwynedd, North Wales in UK on intertidal sand.

References

External links
INA card

Biota of Wales
Coscinodiscophyceae
Protists described in 1994
Ochrophyte species